Leslie Reginald Cox FRS (22 November 1897, Islington – 5 August 1965) was an English palaeontologist and malacologist.

Education
Cox was born to parents who worked as government servants, in the Post Office telephone engineers' department. When he was still young, the family moved to Harringay, where he at age six started attendance at the South Harringay County School. In 1909, he entered Owen's School in Islington, one of the old London grammar schools.

Awards and honours
Cox was elected a Fellow of the Royal Society in 1950. His nomination reads:

He was elected president of the Geologists' Association for 1954–56.

Career
In August 1916, Cox began his war service.

Publications
Cox's most important publications include:
The fauna of the basal shell-bed of the Portland Stone, Isle of Portland.// Proceedings of the Dorset natural-historical and archeological Society, 1925.– Vol. 46.– p. 113-172, pls. 1-5.Synopsis of the Lamellibranchia and Gastropoda of the Portland beds of England. Part I.// Proceedings of the Dorset natural-historical and archeological Society, 1929.– Vol. 50.– p. 131-202.Fossil Mollusca from southern Persia (Iran) and Bahrei Island.// Memoirs of the Geological Survey of India. Palaeontologia indica, 1936.– N. S., vol. 22, mem. №2.– ii+69 pp., 8 pls.A survey of the Mollusca of the British Great Oolite series primarily a nomenclatorial revision of the monographs by Morris et Lycett (1851-1855), Lycett (1836) and Blake (1905-1907). Part II.// Palaeontographical Society. Monographs, 1950.– Vol. 105, №449. – p. 49-105. (together with W. J. Arkell)Cretaceous and Eocene fossils from the Gold Coast.// Gold Coast Geological Survey. Bulletin, 1952.– №17.– 68 pp., 5 pls.The British Cretaceous Pleurotomariidae.// The Bulletin of the British Museum (Natural History). Geology, 1960.– p. 385-423, 1 fig., pls. 44-60.The molluscan fauna and probable Lower Cretaceous age of the Nanutarra formation of Western Australia.// Department of National Development. Bureau of Mineral Resources, Geology and Geophysics. Bulletin, 1961.– №61.– 53 pp., 1 fig., 7 pls.Jurassic Bivalvia and Gastropoda from Tanganyika and Kenya.// Bulletin of the British Museum (Natural History). Geology, 1965.– Suppl. 1.– 213 pp., 2 figs., 30 pls.''

References

1897 births
1965 deaths
20th-century British geologists
English malacologists
People educated at Dame Alice Owen's School
People from Harringay
People from Islington (district)
Fellows of the Royal Society
Lyell Medal winners
English palaeontologists
20th-century British zoologists
Presidents of the Geologists' Association